Below Utopia, also known as Body Count, is a 1997 independent film directed by Kurt Voss. The movie stars Justin Theroux, Alyssa Milano and Ice-T. Milano was also the executive producer of the film. Ice-T had composed an instrumental musical score for this film that was not used. The compositions instead appeared on a CD entitled "Below Utopia: The Lost Score". The video release was on March 17, 1998. The DVD release was followed on October 23, 2001. It is also one of the films on a two-pack DVD. The other film is Out-of-Sync.

Plot
Daniel returns to his family's mansion for the holidays along with his girlfriend Susanne. His family's seemingly utopian existence is overshadowed by not only the death of Daniel's brother, but also by Daniel's failure to live up to his brother's potential. However, this quickly becomes inconsequential, as blood-thirsty killers soon show up to steal the artwork, and whatever else they can find in the house. As the family members are killed, Daniel flees with Susanne in the basement, hoping for survival. Daniel reveals that he not only knows the blood-thirsty killers and is in on the whole thing, but was also responsible for the death of his brother. Daniel kills all the "art thieves" and starts to stage the scene when one of his siblings "rises from the dead" to foil his plan. He is caught in the act of trying to strangle him by Susanne and what ensues is a battle not only for her life, but the life of his last-surviving family member.

Cast
Alyssa Milano as Susanne
Justin Theroux as Daniel Beckett
Ice-T as Jim
Tommy 'Tiny' Lister as Tiny
Robert Pine as Uncle Wilson
Marta Kristen as Marilyn Beckett

References

External links

1997 films
1997 thriller films
CineTel Films films
American thriller films
1990s English-language films
Films directed by Kurt Voss
1990s American films